Geoffrey L. Duncan (born April 1, 1975) is  an American businessman, politician, former professional baseball player, and political commentator for CNN. He served as the 12th lieutenant governor of Georgia from 2019 to 2023. A member of the Republican Party, Duncan is a former member of the Georgia House of Representatives.

After playing college baseball for the Georgia Tech Yellow Jackets, Duncan played professional baseball for six years until a shoulder injury forced him to retire. He went into business and was elected to the Georgia House in 2012. Duncan was elected lieutenant governor in 2018, but he did not seek re-election in 2022, with fellow Republican Burt Jones being elected to replace him.

In the wake of the 2020 U.S. presidential election, Duncan was among the few Republican Party officials who openly and outspokenly criticized Donald Trump for falsely claiming the election was stolen. 

On January 24, 2023, Duncan joined CNN as a political commentator.

Career

Baseball 
Duncan attended Chattahoochee High School in Johns Creek, Georgia, and the Georgia Institute of Technology, where he played college baseball for the Yellow Jackets. He played in the 1994 College World Series with Georgia Tech, losing in the final round. He played in Minor League Baseball for the Florida Marlins organization from 1996 through 2000, reaching Triple-A, when a shoulder injury ended his career. Duncan retired from baseball and went into business.

Business 
After retiring from baseball, Duncan became chief executive officer for Wellview Health, a healthcare and wellness company.

Politics 
Duncan was elected to the Georgia House of Representatives in 2012.

Duncan announced he would run for lieutenant governor of Georgia on April 10, 2017. He resigned from the Georgia House in September 2017 to focus on running for lieutenant governor in 2018.

On May 22, 2018, David Shafer received 48.9% of the vote in the Republican primary with Duncan coming in second place with 26.6%. Since no candidate received a majority of votes, the election then went to a runoff held on July 24. The runoff election focused largely on Shafer's record at the capitol and a number of ethical questions surrounding his candidacy. On July 24, Duncan defeated Shafer with 50.16% of the vote. He defeated Democratic nominee Sarah Riggs Amico in the general election, receiving nearly 52% of the vote and avoiding another runoff.

Duncan was inaugurated lieutenant governor on January 14, 2019. On December 6, 2020, Duncan and Governor Brian Kemp put out a joint statement explaining that calling a joint session of the Georgia General Assembly to appoint their own electors to send to the United States Electoral College would be unconstitutional.

Following unsuccessful efforts to overturn the election of Democratic candidate Joe Biden in the 2020 presidential election, in March 2021 Georgia Republicans enacted the controversial Election Integrity Act of 2021 that imposed new restrictions on voting. Days later, Duncan said during a CNN interview that momentum for the legislation grew from "the fallout from the ten weeks of misinformation that flew in from former President Donald Trump. I went back over the weekend to really look at where this really started to gain momentum in the legislature, and it was when Rudy Giuliani showed up in a couple of committee rooms and spent hours spreading misinformation and sowing doubt across, you know, hours of testimony."

In April 2021, Duncan's chief of staff stated that he was unlikely to run for a second term, after he openly contradicted false claims of election fraud in the 2020 presidential election. His chief of staff added that Duncan has yet to make a final decision about whether to run again in 2022. On May 17, 2021, Duncan announced that he would not be seeking a second term.

An October 2021 trip to New Hampshire to promote his book GOP 2.0, which outlines plans for a post-Trump future for the Republican Party, fueled speculation in his home state that Duncan may be positioning himself to run for president in 2024.

Duncan said he did not vote for either candidate, Raphael Warnock nor Herschel Walker, in the 2022 Senate election.

Personal life 
Duncan and his wife Brooke have three sons. They live in Cumming, Georgia.

Electoral history

Bibliography 
 GOP 2.0 (2021)

References

External links 
 
 
 

|-

|-

1975 births
Living people
21st-century American politicians
American expatriate baseball players in Canada
Baseball pitchers
Baseball players from Pennsylvania
Brevard County Manatees players
Calgary Cannons players
Georgia Tech Yellow Jackets baseball players
Kane County Cougars players
Lieutenant Governors of Georgia (U.S. state)
Republican Party members of the Georgia House of Representatives
People from Cumming, Georgia
People from New Kensington, Pennsylvania
Portland Sea Dogs players
Utica Blue Sox players